Malayathele is a genus of southeast Asian mygalomorph spiders in the family Euagridae. It was first described by Peter J. Schwendinger, C. Lehmann-Graber and K. Hongpadharakiree in 2020, and it has only been found in Malaysia.

Species
 it contains four species:
M. cameronensis Schwendinger, 2020 – Malaysia (Peninsula)
M. kanching Schwendinger, 2020 (type) – Malaysia (Peninsula)
M. maculosa Schwendinger, 2020 – Malaysia (Peninsula)
M. ulu Schwendinger, 2020 – Malaysia (Peninsula)

See also
 List of Euagridae species

References

Euagridae genera
Spiders of Asia